The 2019 Men's African Volleyball Championship was the 22nd edition of the Men's African Volleyball Championship, a biennial international volleyball tournament organised by the African Volleyball Confederation (CAVB). The tournament was held in Tunis, Tunisia from 21 to 28 July 2019.

Qualification
10 teams have registered to participate in the 2019 African Championship.

Pools composition
The draw was held in Tunis, Tunisia on 20 July 2019.

Squads

Venue

Pool standing procedure
 Number of matches won
 Match points
 Sets ratio
 Points ratio
 Result of the last match between the tied teams

Match won 3–0 or 3–1: 3 match points for the winner, 0 match points for the loser
Match won 3–2: 2 match points for the winner, 1 match point for the loser.

Preliminary round
All times are West Africa Time (UTC+01:00).

Pool A

|}

|}

Pool B

|}

|}

Final round
All times are West Africa Time (UTC+01:00).

9th–10th places

9th place match

|}

5th–8th places

5th–8th semifinals

|}

7th place match

|}

5th place match

|}

Final four

Semifinals

|}

3rd place match

|}

Final

|}

Final standing

Awards

Most Valuable Player
 Hamza Nagga
Best Spiker
 Yvan Kody
Best Blocker
 Salim Mbarki
Best Server
 Didier Sali Hilé

Best Setter
 Ahmed Awal Mbutngam
Best Receiver
 Ismaïl Moalla
Best Libero
 Ilyes Achour

See also
2019 Women's African Volleyball Championship

References

External links
Official website

2019 Men
African Men's Volleyball Championship
Men's African Volleyball Championship
2019 in Tunisian sport
International volleyball competitions hosted by Tunisia
Sports competitions in Tunis
Men's African Volleyball Championship